The Ice Dream with Roy and HG was a sports/comedy talk show, broadcast every night during 2002 Winter Olympics, presented by Australian comedy duo Roy and HG.

Targets of humour during the coverage of the 2002 Winter Olympics included figure skating, curling, Monaco's bobsleigh team (especially Albert II, Prince of Monaco). They promoted the Smiggin Holes 2010 Winter Olympic bid, even presenting it to IOC president Jacques Rogge, who described it as "very impressive". According to The Ice Dream, during the 1952 Olympics, Cedric Sloane skewered a seagull during a cross-country skiing event, putting a curse on the Australian team that could only be lifted when Australia won a gold medal (achieved by Steven Bradbury).

See also 
 Australia at the Olympics

External links
 
 newspaper comment.
 The Official Anthem of the Smiggins Hole 2010 Bid - Unleash the Mighty Mongrel - By Sean Peter
The Dream at the National Film and Sound Archive

Australian comedy television series
Seven Network original programming
Olympics on Australian television
2002 Australian television series debuts
2002 Australian television series endings
2002 Winter Olympics
Australian sports television series